The 1961 International Cross Country Championships was held in Nantes, France, on March 26, 1961. This year, an official junior championship (for athletes under 21 on the day of the race) was introduced.  A report on the men's event was given in the Glasgow Herald.

Complete results for men, junior men, medallists, 
 and the results of British athletes were published.

Medallists

Individual Race Results

Men's (8.9 mi / 14.3 km)

Junior Men's (4.7 mi / 7.5 km)

Team Results

Men's

Junior Men's

Participation
An unofficial count yields the participation of 109 athletes from 10 countries.

 (14)
 (14)
 (14)
 (9)
 (14)
 (9)
 (14)
 (9)
 (5)
 (7)

See also
 1961 in athletics (track and field)

References

International Cross Country Championships
International Cross Country Championships
Cross
International Cross Country Championships
Sport in Nantes
Cross country running in France